The siege of Harput was a three-day siege directed by the Ottomans against the Safavid held city of Harput.

After the Ottoman victory at Chaldiran, the Ottomans began to capture eastern Anatolian territories from the Safavids.

In March 1516 under the command of Beylerbeyi Hüsrev Pasha the Ottomans laid siege to Harput. The siege lasted for three days until Harput was conquered on 26 March.

Harput was organised as a sanjak affiliated to the Diyarbakir Beylerbeyliği.

References

Battles involving the Ottoman Empire